Laura Redondo Mora (born 3 July 1988 in Barcelona) is a Spanish athlete specialising in the hammer throw. She competed at the 2015 World Championships in Beijing without qualifying for the final.

Her personal best in the event is 70,66 metres set in la nucía iin 2021.
Actually they have the Spain record in hammer(4 kg)

Competition record

References

External links
 
 
 
 

1988 births
Living people
Spanish female hammer throwers
Olympic athletes of Spain
Athletes (track and field) at the 2020 Summer Olympics
Mediterranean Games competitors for Spain
Mediterranean Games gold medalists for Spain
Mediterranean Games gold medalists in athletics
Athletes (track and field) at the 2018 Mediterranean Games
Athletes (track and field) at the 2022 Mediterranean Games
World Athletics Championships athletes for Spain
Athletes from Barcelona
20th-century Spanish women
21st-century Spanish women